Calgary-Currie is a provincial electoral district in Calgary, Alberta, Canada. It was created in 1971 and is mandated to return a single member to the Legislative Assembly of Alberta using the first past the post method of voting.

The district is currently represented by Nicholas Milliken, a member of the United Conservative Party who was elected in the 2019 Alberta general election.

History
The Calgary-Currie electoral district was created in the 1971 boundary redistribution from parts of Calgary Glenmore and Calgary West.

The 2010 boundary redistribution saw the riding significantly changed. The Electoral Boundary Commission originally tried to abolish the riding but several complaints were submitted to the Commission. Instead the riding was completely redrawn with the north boundary pushed up to the Bow River from 17 Avenue SW into land that was part of Calgary-Bow and Calgary-Buffalo. The east boundary which had gone as far as 1 Street SE was moved west to 14 Street SW losing land to Buffalo and Calgary-Elbow. The south boundary was significantly revised with Elbow causing the riding to gain and lose land with that constituency in a few different places and finally the west boundary was straightened out to run along Sarcee Trail causing the riding to gain land from Calgary-West.

Boundary history

Electoral history

The Calgary-Currie electoral district was created in the boundary redistribution of 1971. The electoral district was named after the former Currie Army Barracks which used to exist in Southwest Calgary. The district replaced large portions of Calgary West and Calgary Glenmore.

The first general election in 1971 saw Progressive Conservative candidate Fred Peacock win a tight race over incumbent Social Credit member Frederick Colborne who had previously represented Calgary Centre. His old electoral district was abolished and he decided to run in Currie instead of Calgary-Buffalo.

During his first term Peacock served as a cabinet minister in the Lougheed government. He was re-elected for a second term in 1975 before he retired from provincial politics in 1979.

The second MLA to represent the district was Dennis Anderson. He won a large majority in the 1979 election. He was re-elected in 1982 with the highest popular vote in the districts history. He was also easily re-elected in 1986 and again in 1989 before retiring in 1993.

The third MLA was Progressive Conservative candidate Jocelyn Burgener who won a hotly contested election in 1993 against Mark Waters son of Senator Stan Waters and leader of the Alberta Political Alliance. She was re-elected in 1997 before retiring in 2001.

Former Calgary Alderman Jon Lord became the fourth representative for the district. He was elected with a large majority in the 2001 election. Lord ran for a second term but was defeated by Liberal candidate Dave Taylor, who was a talk radio host in Calgary prior to running for office.

Taylor was re-elected to his second term in 2008. After the election he ran for leadership of the Liberal party but was defeated by David Swann. He left the Liberal caucus on April 11, 2010 to sit as an independent. On January 24, 2011, Taylor joined the Alberta Party.

Legislature results

1971 general election

1975 general election

1979 general election

1982 general election

1986 general election

1989 general election

1993 general election

1997 general election

2001 general election

2004 general election

2008 general election

2012 general election

2015 general election

2019 general election

Senate nominee results

2004 Senate nominee election district results

Voters had the option of selecting 4 Candidates on the Ballot

2012 Senate nominee election district results

Student Vote results

2004 election

On November 19, 2004 a Student Vote was conducted at participating Alberta schools to parallel the 2004 Alberta general election results. The vote was designed to educate students and simulate the electoral process for persons who have not yet reached the legal majority. The vote was conducted in 80 of the 83 provincial electoral districts with students voting for actual election candidates. Schools with a large student body that reside in another electoral district had the option to vote for candidates outside of the electoral district then where they were physically located.

2012 election

See also
List of Alberta provincial electoral districts

References

Further reading

External links
Elections Alberta
The Legislative Assembly of Alberta

Alberta provincial electoral districts
Politics of Calgary
Constituencies established in 1971